Staphylococcus xylosus is a species of bacteria belonging to the genus Staphylococcus. It is a Gram-positive bacterium that forms clusters of cells. Like most staphylococcal species, it is coagulase-negative and exists as a commensal on the skin of humans and animals and in the environment.

Staphylococcus xylosus may be used as CNC (coagulase-negative cocci) in salami fermentation.

It appears to be far more common in animals than in humans. S. xylosus has very occasionally been identified as a cause of human infection, but in some cases it may have been misidentified.

Identification
Staphylococcus xylosus is normally sensitive to fleroxacin, methicillin, penicillin, teicoplanin, erythromycin and tetracycline, and resistant to novobiocin. It is highly active biochemically, producing acid from a wide variety of carbohydrates.

Acid  and gas are produced from D-(+)-galactose, D-(+)-mannose, D-(+)-mannitol, maltose, and lactose. Caseinolytic and gelatinase activities are normally present.

It normally produces slime but not capsules. This ability is lost upon subculture. Its cell wall peptidoglycan is similar to the L-Lys-Gly3-5 L-Ser0.6-1.5 type found in predominantly human species.

Clinical importance
Staphylococcus xylosus is a member of the skin flora of humans and other animals. It has been associated with:
 Nasal dermatitis in gerbils
 Pyelonephritis in humans
 Avian staphylococcosis
 Bovine intramammary infection

It is also found in milk, cheese, and sausage.

References

Further reading

External links
 Type strain of Staphylococcus xylosus at BacDive -  the Bacterial Diversity Metadatabase

Gram-positive bacteria
xylosus
Bacteria described in 1975